Jiali Plaza, also known as Ping An Building, is a  tall skyscraper located in Wuhan, China. The 61 storey building was completed in 1997 under the design by WMKY Lim. The building has two underground floors which are used as a car park.

See also
 List of skyscrapers

External links
SkyscraperPage.com's entry
Emporis.com - Building ID 104194

Skyscraper office buildings in Wuhan
Buildings and structures completed in 1997